Babelomurex wormaldi is a species of medium-sized sea snail, a marine gastropod mollusc in the subfamily Coralliophilinae, the coral snails.

Description
The shell size varies between 19 mm and 30 mm

Distribution
This species is distributed in the Pacific Ocean along the Philippines and New Zealand.

References

 Powell A. W. B., New Zealand Mollusca, William Collins Publishers Ltd, Auckland, New Zealand 1979 
 Oliverio M. (2008) Coralliophilinae (Neogastropoda: Muricidae) from the southwest Pacific. In: V. Héros, R.H. Cowie & P. Bouchet (eds), Tropical Deep-Sea Benthos 25. Mémoires du Muséum National d'Histoire Naturelle 196: 481-585 page(s): 544
 

Gastropods of New Zealand
wormaldi
Gastropods described in 1980